LaQuandra S. Nesbitt MD, MPH a board certified family physician, is the former Washington, D.C. Department of Health Director  She was appointed by Mayor Muriel Bowser in 2015.  Prior to her tenure in DC, Nesbitt was Director of the Louisville Metro Department of Public health and Wellness. In November 2022, Nesbitt was appointed Executive Director of the Center for Population Health Sciences and Health Equity at the George Washington University School of Medicine & Health Sciences.  She will also be a senior associate dean and professor of medicine. She will also be the inaugural Bicentennial Endowed Professor of Medicine and Health Sciences.  She stepped down from the DC Health Department in July 2022.

Early life and education
At the University of Michigan, Nesbitt earned her undergraduate degree in biochemistry before getting her medical degree from Wayne State University School of Medicine and a MPH with a concentration in Health Care Managment and Policy from the Harvard School of Public Health.

Her internship was done at  University Hospitals of Cleveland/University Hospitals of Cleveland and her family medicine residence at University of Maryland’s Department of Family Medicine. Sje went on to serve a Minority Health Policy Fellowship at Commonwealth Fund Harvard University.

Career
Her time in Louisville focused on violence prevention and implementing the Affordable Care Act. While there, Governor Steve Beshear appointed her to a four year term on the Early Childhood Advisory Council. She was appointed to a similar position in DC at the State Early Childhood Development Coordinating Council and is Chair of the Association of State and Territorial Health Official’s Performance Improvement and Accreditation Policy Committee.

Nesbitt was one of the parties sued by Dede Byrne and the Thomas More Society for being denied a religious exemption for the COVID-19 vaccination mandate for health care workers.

Publications
Population Health: Management, Policy, and Technology, executive editor

References

American city health commissioners
University of Michigan alumni
Wayne State University School of Medicine alumni
Harvard School of Public Health alumni
Family physicians
George Washington University School of Medicine & Health Sciences faculty
Academic administrators
Year of birth missing (living people)
Living people